Kraut Canyon is a valley in Lincoln County, New Mexico, in the United States. 

A large share of the early settlers being natives of Germany led to the valley to be called Kraut Canyon, from the ethnic slur "kraut".

References

Landforms of Lincoln County, New Mexico
Valleys of New Mexico